Higos Urco pampa is a historical place in Chachapoyas, Peru where the battle of the same name was fought on 6 June 1821, before José de San Martín proclaimed Peruvian independence.

In remembrance and commemoration of the battle, there is a small square raised.

References

Populated places in the Amazonas Region